The Yasar Dogu Tournament 1997, was a wrestling event held in Ankara, Turkey between 14 and 16 February 1997. This tournament was held as 25th.

This international tournament includes competition includes competition in men's  freestyle wrestling. This ranking tournament was held in honor of the two time Olympic Champion, Yaşar Doğu.

Medal table

Medal overview

Men's freestyle

Participating nations

References 

Yasar Dogu 1997
1997 in sport wrestling
Sports competitions in Ankara
Yaşar Doğu Tournament
International wrestling competitions hosted by Turkey